Yaroslavl Levtsovo is an air base in Yaroslavl Oblast, Russia located 5 km north of Yaroslavl. It services Antonov An-2 small transport aircraft and Mil Mi-8 helicopters.

Possibly also known as Dadonovo.

History 
The airfield was used for civil aviation in the Soviet era. In 2016, ownership was transferred, with plans to create an aviation museum on the airfield. Since 2010, it is also the site of the Dobrofest music festival.

References 

Soviet Air Force bases
Russian Air Force bases
Airports built in the Soviet Union
Airports in Yaroslavl Oblast